Splitting Heirs is a 1993 British black comedy film directed by Robert Young and starring Eric Idle, Rick Moranis, Barbara Hershey, Catherine Zeta-Jones, John Cleese and Sadie Frost. It features music by Michael Kamen. It was entered in the 1993 Cannes Film Festival.

Plot
The film centers on the aristocratic family of the Dukes of Bournemouth, upon which misfortune has fallen throughout history, leading its members to believe that the family is cursed. The most recent heir, Thomas Henry Butterfly Rainbow Peace, was left in a restaurant as an infant in the 1960s; by the time his parents remembered him, he had disappeared. Meanwhile, in the 1990s Tommy Patel has grown up in an Asian/Indian family in Southall, never doubting his ethnicity despite being taller than anyone else in the house, fair-haired, blue-eyed, light-skinned—and not liking curry. From the family corner shop he commutes to the City where he works for the Bournemouth family's stockbroking firm, handling multimillion-pound deals.

Tommy is given the job of acting as host to the visiting American representative of the firm, Henry Bullock, who turns out to be the son of the head of the firm, the present Duke. They become friends and the friendship survives Henry becoming the new Duke when his father dies. Circumstantial evidence shows that the true Bournemouth heir is actually Tommy; we see a series of family portraits each of which captures something of Tommy's facial characteristics, and his Indian mother tells him the story of his adoption. He consults the lawyer who dealt with his adoption, Raoul P. Shadgrind, who says Tommy has no hope of proving his claim, but plants the idea of him obtaining his rightful place in the family by getting Henry out of the way; Shadgrind himself then engineers a variety of 'accidents' in the belief that he will share in the spoils as Tommy's partner. Love interest is provided by Tommy's and Henry's (shared at the same time) lover, later the new Duchess and their (shared at different times) mother, the dowager Duchess. The final resolution of everyone's doubts and misconceptions leaves everyone living "happily ever after – "well, for a bit, at least..."

Cast

Reception
The film received mostly negative reviews and currently has a score of 8% on Rotten Tomatoes based on 13 reviews. Roger Ebert of the Chicago Sun-Times gave the film a mixed review. He believed much of the humor was lost on American audiences, while Hershey's performance was the film's highlight yet Idle and Moranis should have switched roles.

Box office
The film grossed £1.3 million ($1.9 million) in the United Kingdom.  It performed poorly in the United States and Canada with a gross of just $3.2 million.

Video release
The film has been released on VHS in the United States and Britain. A Region 1 DVD has been released in the United States, and a Nordic edition Region 2 DVD was released in 2010. A Blu-ray was released through Mill Creek Entertainment on 19 October 2021.

References

External links
 
 
 
 

1993 films
1990s black comedy films
1990s sex comedy films
1990s comedy thriller films
British black comedy films
British sex comedy films
Films about murder
Films about royalty
Films set in the 1960s
Films set in the 1990s
Films with screenplays by Eric Idle
Films directed by Robert Young
Universal Pictures films
Films scored by Michael Kamen
1993 comedy films
1990s English-language films
1990s British films